Mustabada railway station (station code:MBD) is an Indian Railways station is located in Mustabada, Vijayawada and a satellite station of Vijayawada in Andhra Pradesh. It is situated on Duvvada–Vijayawada section of Howrah–Chennai main line and is administered by Vijayawada railway division in South Coast Railway zone.

Classification 
Mustabada railway station is categorized as a Non-Suburban Grade-6 (NSG-6) station in the Vijayawada railway division.

References

External links 
 

Railway stations in Krishna district
Railway stations in Vijayawada railway division
Transport in Krishna district
Buildings and structures in Krishna district